is a Japanese visual novel developed and released by Alchemist on February 25, 2010. The gameplay in No Fate! Only the Power of Will follows a plot-line which offers pre-determined scenarios with courses of interaction.

Gameplay
Much of the gameplay requires little interaction from the player as the majority of the time is spent reading the text that appears on the game's screen. The text being displayed represents the thoughts of the characters or the dialogue between them. The player is occasionally presented with choices to determine the direction of the game. Depending on what is chosen, the plot may progress in a specific direction.

Story
Hero Iinchou (委員長) is walking around one day when a girl comes out of the sky. She said she was from the world beyond inner space. The plot revolves around her relationship with Iinchou and acclimating her to the school he attends.

Development

Reception

References

External links
official Xbox 360 website 

2010 video games
Alchemist (company) games
Bishōjo games
Japan-exclusive video games
PlayStation Portable games
Single-player video games
Video games developed in Japan
Visual novels
Xbox 360 games